Chevroches is a commune, a village, in the Nièvre department in Bourgogne-Franche-Comté, in central France.

Geography 
Chevroches lies between the Canal du Nivernais, the river Yonne, and the place where the river Yonne used to be.

History 
This village is really old, according to archeologists, there was smithing activity from the second to the fourth century. All the ancient objects which has been found there are now in a museum in Clamecy, just few miles away from Chevroches.

This village church was probably built in the ninth century, and Chevroches old name was "Cava Roca" [ kava ʁɔka ] which means hollow rock. That name is linked to the stone quarry, which is now abandoned.

Demographics
Inhabitants are called Cavarocois in French. On 1 January 2019, the estimated population was 122.

See also
Communes of the Nièvre department

References

Communes of Nièvre